In probability theory, a real valued stochastic process X is called a semimartingale if it can be decomposed as the sum of a local martingale and a càdlàg adapted finite-variation process. Semimartingales are "good integrators", forming the largest class of processes with respect to which the Itô integral and the Stratonovich integral can be defined.

The class of semimartingales is quite large (including, for example, all continuously differentiable processes, Brownian motion and Poisson processes). Submartingales and supermartingales together represent a subset of the semimartingales.

Definition
A real valued process X defined on the filtered probability space (Ω,F,(Ft)t ≥ 0,P) is called a semimartingale if it can be decomposed as

where M is a local martingale and A is a càdlàg adapted process of locally bounded variation.

An Rn-valued process X = (X1,…,Xn) is a semimartingale if each of its components Xi is a semimartingale.

Alternative definition
First, the simple predictable processes are defined to be linear combinations of processes of the form Ht = A1{t > T} for stopping times T and FT -measurable random variables A. The integral H · X for any such simple predictable process H and real valued process X is

This is extended to all simple predictable processes by the linearity of H · X in H.

A real valued process X is a semimartingale if it is càdlàg, adapted, and for every t ≥ 0,

is bounded in probability. The Bichteler-Dellacherie Theorem states that these two definitions are equivalent .

Examples
 Adapted and continuously differentiable processes are continuous finite variation processes, and hence semimartingales.
 Brownian motion is a semimartingale.
 All càdlàg martingales, submartingales and supermartingales are semimartingales.
 Itō processes, which satisfy a stochastic differential equation of the form dX = σdW + μdt are semimartingales. Here, W is a Brownian motion and σ, μ are adapted processes.
 Every Lévy process is a semimartingale.

Although most continuous and adapted processes studied in the literature are semimartingales, this is not always the case.

 Fractional Brownian motion with Hurst parameter H ≠ 1/2 is not a semimartingale.

Properties

 The semimartingales form the largest class of processes for which the Itō integral can be defined.
 Linear combinations of semimartingales are semimartingales.
 Products of semimartingales are semimartingales, which is a consequence of the integration by parts formula for the Itō integral.
 The quadratic variation exists for every semimartingale.
 The class of semimartingales is closed under optional stopping, localization, change of time and absolutely continuous change of measure.
 If X is an Rm valued semimartingale and f is a twice continuously differentiable function from Rm to Rn, then f(X) is a semimartingale. This is a consequence of Itō's lemma.
 The property of being a semimartingale is preserved under shrinking the filtration. More precisely, if X is a semimartingale with respect to the filtration Ft, and is adapted with respect to the subfiltration Gt, then X is a Gt-semimartingale.
 (Jacod's Countable Expansion) The property of being a semimartingale is preserved under enlarging the filtration by a countable set of disjoint sets. Suppose that Ft is a filtration, and Gt is the filtration generated by Ft and a countable set of disjoint measurable sets. Then, every Ft-semimartingale is also a Gt-semimartingale.

Semimartingale decompositions
By definition, every semimartingale is a sum of a local martingale and a finite variation process. However, this decomposition is not unique.

Continuous semimartingales
A continuous semimartingale uniquely decomposes as X = M + A where M is a continuous local martingale and A is a continuous finite variation process starting at zero. 

For example, if X is an Itō process satisfying the stochastic differential equation dXt = σt dWt + bt dt, then

Special semimartingales
If this decomposition exists, then it is unique up to a P-null set.

Every special semimartingale is a semimartingale. Conversely, a semimartingale is a special semimartingale if and only if the process Xt* ≡ sups ≤ t |Xs| is locally integrable .

For example, every continuous semimartingale is a special semimartingale, in which case M and A are both continuous processes.

Multiplicative decompositions 
Recall that  denotes the stochastic exponential of semimartingale .

Purely discontinuous semimartingales / quadratic pure-jump semimartingales
A semimartingale is called purely discontinuous (Kallenberg 2002) if its quadratic variation [X] is a finite variation pure-jump process, i.e.,
.
By this definition, time is a purely discontinuous semimartingale even though it exhibits no jumps at all. Alternative (and preferred) terminology quadratic pure-jump semimartingale  refers to the fact that the quadratic variation of a purely discontinuous semimartingale is a pure jump process. Every finite variation semimartingale is  a quadratic pure-jump semimartingale. An adapted continuous process is a quadratic pure-jump semimartingale if and only if it is of finite variation.

For every semimartingale X there is a unique continuous local martingale  starting at zero such that  is a quadratic pure-jump semimartingale. The local martingale  is called the continuous martingale part of X.

Observe that  is measure-specific. By Girsanov's theorem  is a continuous finite variation process, yielding .

Continuous-time and discrete-time components of a semimartingale 
Every semimartingale  has a unique decomposition where , the continuous-time component  does not jump at predictable times, and the discrete-time component   is equal to the sum of its jumps at predictable times in the semimartingale topology. One then has . Typical examples of the continuous-time component are Itô process and Lévy process. The discrete-time component is often taken to be a Markov chain but in general the predictable jump times may not be well ordered, i.e., in principle  may jump at every rational time. Observe also that  is not necessarily of finite variation, even though it is equal to the sum of its jumps (in the semimartingale topology). For example, on the time interval  take  to have independent increments, with jumps at times  taking values  with equal probability.

Semimartingales on a manifold

The concept of semimartingales, and the associated theory of stochastic calculus, extends to processes taking values in a differentiable manifold. A process X on the manifold M is a semimartingale if f(X) is a semimartingale for every smooth function f from M to R.  Stochastic calculus for semimartingales on general manifolds requires the use of the Stratonovich integral.

See also
Sigma-martingale

References

Martingale theory